David Mark Weber (born October 24, 1952) is an American science fiction and fantasy author. He has written several science-fiction and fantasy books series, the best known of which is the Honor Harrington science-fiction series. His first novel, which he worked on with Steve White, sold in 1989 to Baen Books. Baen remains Weber's major publisher.

Writing career 
Born in Cleveland, Ohio, on October 24, 1952, Weber began writing while in fifth grade. Some of Weber's first jobs within the writing/advertising world began after high school when he worked as copywriter, typesetter, proofreader, and paste-up artist. He later earned an undergraduate degree from Warren Wilson College in Asheville, North Carolina and a M.A. in history from Appalachian State University in Boone, North Carolina.

Weber's first published novels grew out of his work as a wargame designer for the Task Force board wargame Starfire. Weber used the Starfire universe as a setting for short stories that he wrote for the company's Nexus magazine, and he also wrote the Starfire novel Insurrection (1990) with Stephen White after Nexus was canceled; this book was the first in a tetralogy that concluded with their final collaboration, The Shiva Option (2002), which was included in The New York Times Best Seller List.

Weber was influenced by C. S. Forester, Patrick O'Brian, Keith Laumer, H. Beam Piper, Robert A. Heinlein, Roger Zelazny, Christopher Anvil and Anne McCaffrey

Weber's novels range from epic fantasy (Oath of Swords, The War God's Own) to space opera (Path of the Fury, The Armageddon Inheritance) to alternate history (1632 series with Eric Flint) and military science fiction with in-depth characterization.

A lifetime military history buff, David Weber has carried his interest of history into his fiction. He is said to be interested in most periods of history, with a strong emphasis on the military and diplomatic aspects.

Weber prefers to write about strong characters. He develops a character's background story in advance in considerable detail because he wants to achieve that degree of comfort level with the character. Weber has said he writes primarily in the evenings and at night.

Weber says he makes an effort to accept as many invitations to science fiction conferences and conventions as he can, because he finds the direct feedback from readers that he gets at conventions extremely useful. He makes a habit of Tuckerizing people from fandom, particularly in the Honor Harrington books (see, e.g., Jordin Kare).

In 2008, Weber donated his archive to the Department of Rare Books and Special Collections at Northern Illinois University.

Personal life 

Weber and his wife, Sharon, live in Greenville, South Carolina with their three children and "a passel of dogs".

Weber is a United Methodist lay preacher, and tries to explore in his writing how religions (both real-life and fictional) can be forces for good on the one hand, and misused to defend evil causes on the other.

Weber belongs to the American Small Business Administration, the Science Fiction and Fantasy Writers of America (SFWA), and the NRA.

Published works 

Weber's main works are contained in the following series:
Honorverse
Dahak 
War God
Safehold

References

External links 

 
 
 Baen Books' catalogue for David Weber

1952 births
20th-century American short story writers
20th-century American novelists
21st-century American short story writers
21st-century American novelists
American fantasy writers
American male novelists
American male short story writers
American science fiction writers

Living people
Military science fiction writers
Writers from Cleveland

American United Methodists
20th-century American male writers
21st-century American male writers
Novelists from Ohio
Appalachian State University alumni